Barry Lyons (born 14 March 1945) is an English former professional footballer and manager.

Playing career
Born in Shirebrook, Derbyshire, Lyons started his career with Rotherham United in 1963, making his debut in September 1963. He moved to Nottingham Forest for £45,000 in November 1966. During his time at Forest, he came close to earning a cap for the England U23 team. He was a part of the team which was runner-up in the First Division in the 1966–67 season.

Lyons joined York City for £12,000 in September 1973, where showed some class performances as York won promotion. He scored York's first goal in the higher division, which came against Aston Villa. He moved to Darlington on a free transfer in April 1976 and finished his playing career with the club.

Managerial career
Lyons returned to York City as youth coach in 1979. He became caretaker manager in March 1980 as they were battling to avoid re-election, which he succeeded in doing, and was given the job permanently. He was however removed from the job in December 1981 due to poor results (York having had to seek re-election at the end of the 1980–81 season). He continued in the role of youth team manager until July 1982.

Managerial statistics

References

External links

1945 births
Living people
People from Shirebrook
Footballers from Derbyshire
English footballers
Association football wingers
Rotherham United F.C. players
Nottingham Forest F.C. players
York City F.C. players
Darlington F.C. players
English Football League players
English football managers
York City F.C. managers
English Football League managers
York City F.C. non-playing staff